Massilia aerilata is an aerobic, Gram-negative, rod-shaped, motile bacterium from the genus Massilia and the family  Oxalobacteraceae which was isolated from air samples in the Suwon region of the Republic of Korea. 16S rRNA gene sequence analysis have shown that it belongs to the genus of Massilia. Colonies  of M. aerilata are light yellow.

References

External links
Type strain of Massilia aerilata at BacDive -  the Bacterial Diversity Metadatabase

Burkholderiales
Bacteria described in 2008